James Peter Elder (born 14 December 1950) is a former Australian politician. He was a member of the Legislative Assembly of Queensland from 1989 to 2001, representing Manly until 1992 and Capalaba thereafter. Originally elected as a Labor member and serving as Deputy Premier in the Beattie Government, Elder resigned from the party on 30 November 2000.

Early life
Elder was born in Melbourne. Before his election he was the Queensland manager for an access and scaffolding company, and was the first team manager for the Brisbane Broncos rugby league team.

Political career
Having been elected in 1989, he was appointed Minister for Business, Industry and Regional Development in 1992, serving until 1995. From February to July of that year he was Minister for Health, and moved to Transport until the Goss Government left office in February 1996.

After the resignation of the Goss government and the ALP moving to the opposition benches, he became deputy opposition leader, holding the portfolio of Transport, Youth, Sport and Recreation; his responsibilities were changed to Business, Industry and Transport in December 1996.

Following the election of the Beattie government in 1998 he became Deputy Premier and Minister for State Development and Trade. 

He resigned in November 2000 to contest allegations made by the Shepherdson Inquiry from which no charges resulted. <Shepherdson Inquiry 2001 Findings> Serving out the remainder of his term as an Independent MP, he did not contest the 2001 state election.

References

1950 births
Living people
Deputy Premiers of Queensland
Independent members of the Parliament of Queensland
Members of the Queensland Legislative Assembly
Politicians from Melbourne
Australian Labor Party members of the Parliament of Queensland
Labor Right politicians
21st-century Australian politicians